Scelotrichia kakatu  is a caddisfly from the family Hydroptilidae. This species can be found in the Australasian realm.

References
"Information on Scelotrichia kakatu" Encyclopedia of Life. Web. http://eol.org/pages/592388/overview

Trichoptera
Insects of Australia